Cradlehall was originally the name given to the hall built by Major William Caulfield, later known as cradlehall farmhouse.  

Today it is a residential area in the east of Inverness, Scotland. In addition to housing, Cradlehall has a business park and a number of small businesses. The area was expanded recently with the development of Kessock View.

References

Areas of Inverness